"Untitled (How Could This Happen to Me?)" is a song by Canadian rock band Simple Plan. The ballad was released in March 2005 as the third single from their second studio album, Still Not Getting Any.... The song's official title, when the CD was released, was simply "Untitled".

Music video
The music video tells a story of a car crash on a rainy evening where a young male drunk driver crashes his sedan head-on into a Trans Am driven by a female, resulting in her death. The drunk driver, however, survives relatively uninjured, and ends up arrested by the FBI and ATF. The video was filmed near the famous tunnel in Griffith Park, Los Angeles. Vocalist Pierre Bouvier is seen singing the song at the scene of the car crash, and is also seen at the end of the video where the victim is at the hospital.

The video also shows the backstory of the car crash, accompanied by clips of the victim's family doing things such as: her brother is seen playing video games in the family living room, her sister is doing her homework in her bedroom, their mom is in her house's kitchen washing dishes and their dad is working in his office. Then abruptly just as the two cars collide, the entire family is violently thrown into the walls surrounding them as the boy falls out of his bedroom window and the dad lands on his computer. In a joint letter with MADD, Simple Plan explained the events in the video:

Live performances
When performed live, the guitar solo in the middle of the song is performed by Bouvier. Lead guitarist Jeff Stinco plays a semi-acoustic guitar until the end of the solo, while rhythm guitarist Sébastien Lefebvre and drummer Chuck Comeau come in at the beginning of the solo. Bassist David Desrosiers' main role is backing vocals, with his bass taking a backseat until Bouvier's solo and the final chorus. Stinco also plays a second solo as the song fades out.

In other media
The song has since been used in Mothers Against Drunk Driving anti-drunk driving campaigns.

Track listings
European CD single
 "Untitled (How Could This Happen to Me?)"
 "Welcome to My Life" (live)

Australian CD single
 "Untitled (How Could This Happen to Me?)"
 "Welcome to My Life" (live)
 "Jump" (live)

Charts

Weekly charts

Year-end charts

Certifications

Release history

References

2000s ballads
2005 singles
2005 songs
Simple Plan songs
American alternative rock songs
Songs about driving under the influence
Music videos directed by Marc Klasfeld
Songs written by Pierre Bouvier
Songs written by Chuck Comeau
Song recordings produced by Bob Rock
Lava Records singles
Rock ballads
Vehicle wreck ballads